The Juno Award for "Contemporary Christian/Gospel Album of the Year" has been awarded since 1998, as recognition each year for the best Christian/Gospel music album in Canada. A separate organization, the Gospel Music Association of Canada (GMA Canada), hands out a full array of awards for Canadian Contemporary Christian/Gospel music, covering a wide range of genres, each year with the annual Covenant Awards.

Prior to the award's introduction, gospel albums were considered for the Blues/Gospel Album category.

Winners

Best Gospel Album (1998 - 2002)

Contemporary Christian/Gospel Album of the Year (2003 - Present)

References 

Christian Gospel
Album awards
Christian music awards